Sven Harald Pousette (18 June 1886 – 6 May 1975) was a Swedish diplomat.

Career
Pousette was born on 18 June 1886 in Gävle, Sweden, the son of captain Fredrik Pousette and his wife Valborg (née Bodman). He passed the reserve officer exam in 1907 and graduated with an administrative degree (kansliexamen) in Uppsala in 1908 before becoming an attaché at the Ministry for Foreign Affairs the same year. Pousette served in Washington, D.C. in 1909, was legation secretary in Brussels and The Hague in 1911 and was secretary of the Minister for Foreign Affairs from 1919 to 1920.

He was first legation secretary in Tokyo in 1921, in Rome in 1924 and legation counsellor in 1928. Pousette was director at the Foreign Ministry in 1929 and legation counsellor in Berlin in 1934 and in London in 1938. He became minister plenipotentiary in 1941 and was acting chargé d'affaires in Tehran in 1941 (also accredited to Baghdad) and envoy there from 1945 to 1947 as well as in Reykjavík from 1947 to 1951.

Pousette was chairman of Alliance Française from 1952 to 1959.

Personal life
In 1920 he married Cecilia Cedercrantz (1896–1987), the daughter of county governor Conrad Cedercrantz and Elisabeth (née Sjöcrona). He was the father of the diplomat Tage Pousette (1921–2012). Pousette died on 6 May 1975 in Stockholm and was buried at Lidingö Cemetery.

Awards and decorations
Pousette's awards:
King Gustaf V's Jubilee Commemorative Medal (1928)
Commander First Class of the Order of the Polar Star
Grand Cross of the Order of the Falcon
Grand Cross of the Iranian Order of Homayoun
Grand Cross of the Order of Merit of the Republic of Hungary
Grand Officer of the Order of Civil Merit
Grand Officer of the Order of the Crown of Italy
Grand Officer of the Order of the German Eagle
Commander of the Order of the Dannebrog
Commander of the Order of Saints Maurice and Lazarus
3rd Class of the Order of the Sacred Treasure
3rd Class of the Chinese Order of the Golden Harvest
3rd Class of the Order of the Lion and the Sun
Officer of the Order of Leopold
Officer of the Order of the Crown
Officer of the Order of Orange-Nassau
Officer of the Legion of Honour
King Gustaf V's Olympic commemorative medal (Konung Gustaf V:s olympiska minnesmedalj)
German Olympic Honorary Badge (Tyska olympiska hederstecknet)

References

1886 births
1975 deaths
Ambassadors of Sweden to Iran
Ambassadors of Sweden to Iraq
Ambassadors of Sweden to Iceland
People from Gävle
Commanders First Class of the Order of the Polar Star
Swedish people of Walloon descent
Harald